Shaun Peter Murphy (born 5 November 1970) is an Australian former soccer player. His club career included stints with Notts County (1992–1997), West Bromwich Albion (1997–1999), Sheffield United (1999–2003) and Crystal Palace (2001–02) in England, before returning to Australia for one season to captain Perth Glory (2003–04).

He was a member of the Australian national team and scored a winner against Brazil for Australia in the 2001 Confederations Cup third place play-off match. He also represented Australia at the 1992 Summer Olympics.

International career

International goals
Scores and results list Australia's goal tally first.

References

External links
OzFootball profile

1970 births
Living people
Australian people of Irish descent
Sportsmen from New South Wales
Soccer players from Sydney
Association football defenders
Australian Institute of Sport soccer players
Australian soccer players
Perth SC players
Notts County F.C. players
West Bromwich Albion F.C. players
Sorrento FC players
Sheffield United F.C. players
Crystal Palace F.C. players
Perth Glory FC players
English Football League players
National Soccer League (Australia) players
Olympic soccer players of Australia
Australia international soccer players
Footballers at the 1992 Summer Olympics
2000 OFC Nations Cup players
2001 FIFA Confederations Cup players
Australian expatriate soccer players
Expatriate footballers in England
Australian expatriate sportspeople in England